Daniel (Dani) Zohary (24 April 1926 - 16 December 2016) was an Israeli plant geneticist, agronomist and an influential professor at the Hebrew University. He was the coauthor of a major synthesis, the Domestication of Plants in the Old World first published in 1988 with many later editions.

Dani was born in Jerusalem to Michael Zohary, a botany professor, and Leah. Inspired by travels with his father on botanical expeditions, Dani took an interest in the flora of the region and began to interact with other researchers like Tuviah Kushnir, Daniel Raz and Eviatar. Conscripted at 17, he joined the Palmach and joined the Hebrew University three years later. Study was interrupted by war in 1948 and he was posted into the field where he lost close friends including Tuviah Kushnir. In 1952 he moved to the University of California and worked on his PhD under G. Ledyard Stebbins on the cytogenetics of Dactylis glomerata. He received the John Belling prize in genetics. In 1954 he married Devora and in 1956, he returned to the Hebrew University where he helped found the department of genetics. He guided numerous students who became plant breeders and geneticists. He was also a talented field botanist, among the few in Israel who could identify nearly all of the more than 2500 species of plants found there.

References 

Israeli botanists
1926 births
2016 deaths
Academic staff of the Hebrew University of Jerusalem
University of California alumni
People from Jerusalem